Beta-defensin 106 is a protein that in humans is encoded by the DEFB106A gene.

Defensins form a family of microbicidal and cytotoxic peptides made by neutrophils. Defensins are short, processed peptide molecules that are classified by structure into three groups: alpha-defensins, beta-defensins and theta-defensins. All beta-defensin genes are densely clustered in four to five syntenic chromosomal regions. Chromosome 8p23 contains at least two copies of the duplicated beta-defensin cluster. This duplication results in two identical copies of defensin, beta 106, DEFB106A and DEFB106B, in head-to-head orientation. This gene, DEFB106A, represents the more centromeric copy.

Function

The purified DEFB106 showed antimicrobial activity against Escherichia coli, Candida albicans and Staphylococcus aureus.

References

Further reading

Defensins